Sins of the Flesh is the debut studio album of Sister Machine Gun, released on December 29, 1992, by Wax Trax! Records. It was produced with the aide of KMFDM composer and musician Sascha Konietzko.

Reception

Vincent Jeffries of AllMusic gave the album a one and a half out of five stars, comparing Sins of the Flesh unfavorably to Nine Inch Nails and saying "Sister Machine Gun display neither the vibrant programming nor the skilled songwriting needed to pull off great industrial for the masses."

Track listing

Personnel
Adapted from the Sins of the Flesh liner notes.

Sister Machine Gun
 Tom Gaul – guitar
 Chris Randall – lead vocals, keyboards, programming, production, mixing (2, 5, 8, 9)
 Steve Stoll – drums

Additional performers
 Van Christie – recording (2)
 Dwayne Goettel – keyboards (7)
 Jim Marcus – recording (2)

Production and design
 Sascha Konietzko – production, mixing (2, 5, 8, 9)
 Dave Ogilvie – mixing (1, 3, 4, 6, 7)
 Small Icon Graphics – cover art
 Martin Stebbing – recording (1, 3–9)

Release history

References

External links 
 
 

1992 debut albums
Sister Machine Gun albums
Albums produced by Sascha Konietzko
TVT Records albums
Wax Trax! Records albums